The Mid-Atlantic Emmy Awards are a division of the National Academy of Television Arts and Sciences. The division was founded in 1981 and serves the Mid-Atlantic states and regions.  In addition to granting the Mid-Atlantic Emmy Awards, it recognizes awards scholarships, honors industry veterans at the Silver Circle Celebration, conducts National Student Television Awards of Excellence, has a free research and a nationwide job bank. The chapter also participates in judging Emmy entries at the regional and national levels.

References

Regional Emmy Awards
Awards established in 1981
1981 establishments in the United States